Ulrich Stötzel (born 6 June 1952) is a German organist and conductor.

Life 
Born in Siegen, Stötzel studied church music at the Frankfurt University of Music and Performing Arts and passed the A-Examination there. This was followed by postgraduate studies in the master classes of Edgar Krapp and Helmuth Rilling with a final organ concert exam and choral conducting diploma.

Due to his special merits, he was awarded the title of Kirchenmusikdirektor of the Evangelische Kirche von Westfalen.

Stötzel has been retired since summer 2019.

References

External links 
 
 

German classical organists
German male organists
German conductors (music)
1952 births
Living people
People from Siegen
Kirchenmusikdirektor
Male classical organists